Feng Sheng (1330–1395), was a Chinese general of the Ming dynasty. Feng Sheng's daughter married Zhu Su, Prince of Zhou, fifth son of the Hongwu Emperor and father of Zhu Youdun.

See also
Ming campaign against the Uriankhai

References

Hui people
Year of birth uncertain
1395 deaths